The Cheshire Cat is a fictional character from Lewis Carroll's Alice's Adventures in Wonderland and derived works.

Cheshire Cat may also refer to:

Music 
 Cheshire Cat (Blink-182 album), 1995
 Cheshire Cat (Ronnie Foster album), 1975
 Cheshire Cat, an MC featured on Leftfield's album Rhythm and Stealth

Other uses 
 Cheshire Cat (Thursday Next series), a fictional cat in Jasper Fforde's Thursday Next novels
 Cheshire Cat (comics), a fictional character
 Cheshire Cat idiom or opaque pointer, a computer programming technique
 Cheshire Cat Eating House, a cafe in the Widows' Almshouses, Nantwich, Cheshire, England

See also
 Cheshire (disambiguation)